The Casa Monica Hotel is a historic hotel located in St. Augustine, Florida, in the United States.  It was originally named Casa Monica, then Cordova Hotel, then Alcazar Annex, and now has its original name again. The Casa Monica Hotel is one of the oldest hotels in the United States and is a member of the Historic Hotels of America in the National Trust for Historic Preservation.

History

The hotel was opened in 1888 by Franklin W. Smith, a notable Victorian architecture enthusiast and social reformer who earned a place in Florida history for interesting Henry Flagler in investing in the state. The construction material was poured concrete, of which Franklin Smith was a leading experimenter.  The original exterior finish was natural, leaving horizontal pour marks visible, and matching other grand Flagler era structures in downtown St. Augustine.  Unfortunately, the exterior was altered by covering with a modern material (stucco) in the 1960s. The architectural style was Moorish Revival and Spanish Baroque Revival, in which Smith was also a pioneer promoter.  His own winter home, Villa Zorayda, just a block to the west, was the first Moorish Revival building in St. Augustine.  The hotel's Sun Parlor was the most notable interior room, but it was gutted after the hotel closed.  

Soon after completing the hotel, Smith ran into financial difficulties and sold the hotel, including all fixtures, furnishings, linen, and all other chattel, for $325,000 to oil and railroad tycoon Henry Flagler. Upon purchasing the hotel, Henry Flagler renamed the Casa Monica the Cordova Hotel. Flagler, a founder, with John D. Rockefeller, of the Standard Oil Company, already owned two hotels in St. Augustine, the Ponce de Leon Hotel (now Flagler College) and the Hotel Alcazar (now City Hall and the Lightner Museum).  From 1888 to 1902, the hotel featured parties, balls, fairs and charity events. 

The famous travel agency "Ask Mr. Foster" had its headquarters in the hotel. It was started by Ward G. Foster of St. Augustine, became a national business, and was owned for a time in the 20th century by Peter Ueberroth, one time Commissioner of Baseball.  The building once featured an historic marker as the birthplace of the agency, but it has been removed in recent years.

In 1902, a short bridge was constructed over Cordova Street that connected the second floors of the Cordova Hotel and the Hotel Alcazar. At the completion of the bridge, the Cordova Hotel was again renamed, this time to Alcazar Annex. In 1903, the Alcazar and Alcazar Annex were considered one hotel and advertised as "enlarged and redecorated". In 1932, the conjoined parts of the hotel were closed due to the Great Depression. In 1945, the bridge between the Annex portion and the Alcazar Hotel was removed.

Late 20th century
In February 1962, St. Johns County Commission voted to purchase the former Casa Monica Hotel for $250,000 for use as the St. Johns County Courthouse.  In 1964 the lobby of the then-vacant hotel was used to house police dogs that were used against civil rights demonstrators during the mass campaign led by Dr. Martin Luther King Jr. and Dr. Robert Hayling, see St. Augustine movement. The renovation took over six years to complete. It was finally dedicated as a courthouse in May 1968, and filled that role until the 1990s, housing government offices and archives as well as courtrooms.   A notable feature of the courthouse were murals by the artist Hugo Ohlms, whose distinctive work was also featured in the nearby Catholic Cathedral and at the Ponce de Leon Motor Lodge (another civil rights landmark, where the arrest of Mrs. Peabody, the 72-year-old mother of the governor of Massachusetts, while trying to be served in a racially integrated group, made national headlines in 1964).  The Ohlms murals were removed when the courthouse was remodeled into its second incarnation as a hotel.  Also removed were the stained glass scales of justice that had been in the quatrefoil window over the main door.

Renovation
In February 1997, Richard Kessler, who had previously been involved with the Days Inn chain, was setting up his own Kessler Collection of lodgings.  He purchased the building from St. Johns County for $1.2 million and began to remodel the building to once again become a hotel. The county Tax Collector's office and Property Appraiser's office were given until 1998 to relocate, so workers had to avoid a section of the building for several months. The renovation was completed in less than two years and the property opened in December 1999 under the original name of the "Casa Monica Hotel" (the name came from Saint Monica, the North African mother of St. Augustine, Bishop of Hippo, for whom the Ancient City is named). Richard Kessler and architect Howard W. Davis decided to keep the historic Moorish Revival style of the hotel.  Tina Guarano Davis painted the Moorish-style woodwork in the hotel lobby. The Casa Monica sign on the Cordova Street side of the hotel covers over an earlier sign for the St. Johns County Courthouse.  State historic preservation officials told them to preserve the courthouse sign, so they covered it rather than removing it.  The huge flagpole on top of the hotel is actually a lightning rod.

Present day

Today the Casa Monica Hotel operates as part of the Kessler Collection headquartered in Orlando, Florida.

References

External links

 Casa Monica Hotel - St. Augustine Hotel
 Kessler Collection - Kessler Collection
 Historic Hotels of America National Trust - Historic Hotels of America
 Preferred Hotels - Preferred Hotels
David Nolan, Fifty Feet in Paradise:  The Booming of Florida (Harcourt Brace Jovanovich, 1984).

Hotels established in 1888
Hotels in Florida
Moorish Revival architecture in Florida
Spanish Revival architecture in Florida 
Buildings and structures in St. Augustine, Florida
Railway hotels in the United States
1888 establishments in Florida
Autograph Collection Hotels
Hotels in the Jacksonville metropolitan area
Historic Hotels of America